Jennings Ligon Duncan III (born November 29, 1960) is an American Presbyterian scholar and pastor.

Early life and education
Duncan is native to Greenville, South Carolina. His father was an eighth-generation Southern Presbyterian ruling elder.  Duncan graduated from Greenville Senior High School in 1979 and Furman University in 1983 (B.A., History). He continued his studies at Covenant Theological Seminary with an M.Div. in 1986 and an MA in historical theology in 1987. He completed doctoral studies in theology at the University of Edinburgh, New College in 1995.

He served on the staff of Covenant Presbyterian Church, St. Louis, (1984–1987). He was licensed to preach in 1985 by the Presbytery of Calvary (PCA) in South Carolina, and ordained in 1990.

Institutional and organizational involvement

Reformed Theological Seminary
In the Summer of 1990, Duncan joined the faculty of Reformed Theological Seminary (RTS), Jackson, Mississippi, as the John R. Richardson Chair of Systematic Theology. At the same time he served as assistant pastor of Trinity Presbyterian Church, Jackson, Mississippi (1990–1995), and interim pastor at First Presbyterian Church, Yazoo City, Mississippi (1993).

Effective January 1, 2014, Duncan resigned his position as Sr. Minister at First Presbyterian Church, Jackson, MS, and assumed the role of Chancellor of Reformed Theological Seminary. He continues to teach in the department of Systematic Theology while serving in this role.

First Presbyterian Church and the PCA

Duncan was named senior pastor at First Presbyterian Church of Jackson, Mississippi (PCA) in 1996, and served in that capacity until early 2014.  An active churchman, he has been involved in the courts of the Presbyterian Church in America (PCA) in various ways: General Assembly's Committee on Psalmody; Committees of Commissioners for Covenant Theological Seminary, Mission to North America, and Bills and Overtures; member and chair of the Credentials Committee of the Presbytery of the Mississippi Valley (1996–2002); vice-chair of the General Assembly's Creation Study Committee (1998–2000); member of the search committee for a Coordinator of Reformed University Ministries; chair of the General Assembly's Theological Examination Committee; member of the PCA's Strategic Planning Committee; moderator of the Presbytery of the Mississippi Valley (2001); moderator of the PCA General Assembly (2004), making him the youngest elected to this position in the denomination's history.

Other Organizations

He is the former president of the Alliance of Confessing Evangelicals, a broad coalition of evangelical Christians from various denominations. It aims to call the church to repent of what it see as its worldliness, and to take up the mantle of the Protestant reformers in recovering the centrality of worship and doctrine in the life of the church.  In his capacity as president, Duncan regularly spoke at the Philadelphia Conference on Reformed Theology, an Alliance-related forum that offers quarterly conferences on Reformed doctrine and history. He also contributes to the Alliance's online magazine and blog, Reformation21.

He is also a council member of the Gospel Coalition, a "group of (mostly) pastors and churches in the Reformed heritage who delight in the truth and power of the gospel, and who want the gospel of Christ crucified and resurrected to lie at the center of all we cherish, preach, and teach."  They have created The Gospel Coalition Network, which is a consortium of "Christian pastors and other leaders who stimulate one another to faithfulness and fruitfulness in life and ministry in this rapidly-changing, increasingly urbanized, and spiritually hungry world."

Theological and Social Positions
In 2017, Duncan signed the Nashville Statement.

Gender Roles

Duncan holds to a complementarian view of gender roles.   He believes that 1 Corinthians 14:34, which says 'women should keep silent in the churches', refers to women teaching men (like found in 1Timothy 2:12), This puts him at odds with the popular view espoused by Wayne Grudem and Don Carson who insist that the context shows that Paul is prohibiting women from publicly judging prophecy in the church.  In the church he serves, men teach mixed adult Sunday school classes, occasionally husband/wife teams teach on issues such as parenting and marriage.

Publications

Authored/co-authored

Does Grace Grow Best in Winter? (co-author with J. Nicholas Reid). P & R Publishing, 2009.
Fear Not! (foreword by Jerry Bridges). Christian Focus, 2008.
The Westminster Assembly: A Guide to Basic Bibliography (co-author with David W. Hall). Reformed Academic Press, 1993.
A Short History of the Westminster Assembly(co-author/editor with William Beveridge). Reformed Academic Press, 1993.
The Genesis Debate: Three Views of the Days of Creation (co-author with David W. Hall, Meredith Kline, Lee Irons, Hugh Ross, and Gleason Archer). Crux Press, 2000.
Should We Leave Our Churches? (co-author with Mark Talbot). P&R, 2004.
Women’s Ministry in the Local Church (co-author). Crossway, 2006.

Edited

Matthew Henry’s Method for Prayer (editor). Christian Focus Publications/Christian Heritage, 1994.
The Westminster Confession in the 2lst Century: Essays in Remembrance of the 350th Anniversary of the Westminster Assembly, (general editor and contributor) Mentor, Vol. 1, 2003; Vol. 2, 2004; Vol. 3, 2008.
Give Praise to God: A Vision for Reforming Worship, (editor and contributor) P&R, 2003.

Contributor

The Practice of Confessional Subscription (contributor). University Press of America, 1995.
Reclaiming the Gospel and Reforming Churches, (contributor) Founders Press, 2003.
Letters to Timothy, (contributor) Founders Press, 2004.
Confessing Our Hope, (contributor) GPTS Press, 2004.
The Devoted Life: An Invitation to the Puritan Classics, (contributor) IVP, 2004.
Preaching the Cross (contributor), Crossway, 2007.
Fear Not: Death and the Afterlife from a Christian Perspective (contributor), Christian Focus, 2008.
In My Place Condemned He Stood (contributor), Crossway, 2008.

References

External links
LigonDuncan.com - official website of J. Ligon Duncan III
Ligon Duncan's Complete Bibliography
First Presbyterian Church, Jackson, MS
Alliance's reformation21 online magazine
Alliance Homepage
Council of Biblical Manhood and Womanhood
“Patristics for Busy Pastors”: An Interview with Dr. Ligon Duncan
Together for the Gospel
Twin Lakes Fellowship
Twin Lakes Camp and Conference Center

1960 births
Presbyterian Church in America ministers
American Calvinist and Reformed theologians
Living people
Furman University alumni
Alumni of the University of Edinburgh
People from Greenville, South Carolina
Covenant Theological Seminary alumni
20th-century Calvinist and Reformed theologians
21st-century Calvinist and Reformed theologians